Edward Burnham (25 December 1916 – 30 June 2015) was an English actor whose career spanned over 60 years.

Early years
Burnham was born in Lincolnshire, England, 25 December 1916. After training at RADA and briefly at the Comédie-Française in Paris, he worked on stage in regional repertory theatre, the Liverpool Playhouse, the Old Vic, and in London's West End.

Career
Burnham is best known for the films To Sir, with Love (1967), The Abominable Dr. Phibes (1971) and 10 Rillington Place (1971), and for twice appearing in Doctor Who in The Invasion (1968) and Robot (1974/5). His other television roles include Z-Cars, The Saint, The Avengers, The Troubleshooters, Special Branch, Crown Court, Thriller, Rumpole of the Bailey, Crossroads, Tales of the Unexpected, The Gentle Touch, All Creatures Great and Small, The Bill, Swiss Toni and Black Books. His other films have included When Eight Bells Toll (1971), Young Winston (1972), The Hiding Place (1974), Coming Out of the Ice (1982), Little Dorrit (1987) and Diamond Skulls (1989).

Death
Burnham died aged 98, on 30 June 2015 at his home in England.

Filmography

References

External links
 
 Edward Burnham Obituary in The Guardian

1916 births
2015 deaths
English male stage actors
English male film actors
English male television actors
20th-century British male actors
Male actors from Lincolnshire
Alumni of RADA